Flemington, New Zealand may refer to:

 Flemington, Canterbury
 Flemington, Hawke's Bay